Ptilotus latifolius, the tangled mulla mulla, is a native Australia perennial herb which grows abundantly on sand dunes and stony plains. The key diagnostic features of this plant are its very stem bound, shrub like appearance with densely clustered white white flowers with pink tips when newly blossomed. Each stem is generally supported by one to two leaves and the stems have a fluffy textures as well as the flowers. The petiole is generally long in this species and spike bound.

Taxonomy 
Ptilotus latifolius is a part of the Ptilotus genus which consists of approximately 120 species of annual and perennial herbs and scrubs in the family Amaranthaceae. All species are native to mainland Australia with most of the diversity in this genus occurring in Western Australia in the Pilbara. Common names for the species in this genus include mulla mulla, foxtail, pussy tail and lambs tail. A number of species in the Ptilotus genus are listed as threatened or priority flora in Western Australia.

Reproduction and dispersal 
Seeds develop inside enclosed tepals which acts as a seed cases and is distributed by the wind.

References 

latifolius